Serdar (from "Sardar") was a military rank in the Ottoman Empire and a noble rank in Montenegro and Serbia. Serdars especially served at the borders of Ottoman Empire. It is often translated to 'commander' in English texts.

Serdar was also used in the Principality of Montenegro and the Principality of Serbia as an honorary non-noble title below that of vojvoda. Janko Vukotić, the former prime minister of Montenegro, held the title of serdar.

Uses
 Serdar is a popular male name in Turkey.
 Serdar is a popular male name in Turkmenistan.
 Serdar-ı Ekrem or (Serdar-ı Azam) means the commander-in-chief with the highest rank, and thus, it sometimes refers to the Grand Vizier of the Ottoman Empire.
 Serdar is also used as a noun (especially to give a nostalgic feeling) with its original meaning (i.e. commander-in-chief) in Turkish. For example, "Ordunun serdarı yiğit savaşçılarına saldırı emrini verdi" means "The commander-in-chief of the force ordered his brave fighters to attack."
 The word has been adapted in English with its original or related spellings, i.e. serdar, sardar, sirdar, all meaning commander-in-chief of an army. However, these words are not used in everyday terminology.
 Serdar, a variant of Sirdar and Sardar, a long-standing rank in Western and Southern Asia – was assigned to the British Commander-in-Chief of the British-controlled Egyptian Army in the late 19th and early 20th centuries. The Sirdar resided at the Sirdaria, a three-block-long property in Zamalek which was also the home of British military intelligence in Egypt.

See also
 Serdar or Gyzylarbat is a city in the Balkan province of Turkmenistan.

References 

Ottoman titles
Government of the Ottoman Empire
Titles in Serbia
Titles in Montenegro